Grayson Bourne is a British sprint canoer who competed from the early 1980s to the mid-1990s. He won two medals in the K-2 10000 m event at the ICF Canoe Sprint World Championships with a gold (1990) and a silver (K-2 10000 m: 1989).

Bourne also competed in five Summer Olympics, earning his best finish of fifth in the K-4 1000 m event at Los Angeles in 1984. He won 67 British National titles. Bourne now owns the most successful Kayak ergometer company KayakPro USA LLC who have been suppliers of ergometers to the last 5 Olympic Games and to NASA.

References
 
 
 
 

Canoeists at the 1980 Summer Olympics
Canoeists at the 1984 Summer Olympics
Canoeists at the 1988 Summer Olympics
Canoeists at the 1992 Summer Olympics
Canoeists at the 1996 Summer Olympics
Living people
Olympic canoeists of Great Britain
Year of birth missing (living people)
ICF Canoe Sprint World Championships medalists in kayak
British male canoeists